The 1998 Nebraska gubernatorial election was held on November 3, 1998. Term limits prevented incumbent Governor Ben Nelson, a Democrat, from seeking a third term in office. Republican nominee Mike Johanns, Mayor of Lincoln, defeated Democratic nominee, attorney Bill Hoppner. , this was the last gubernatorial election in Nebraska in which the margin of victory was within single digits. Incidentally, Johanns would later serve in the United States Senate with Nelson from 2009 to 2013.

Democratic primary

Candidates
Bill Hoppner, attorney, Chief of Staff to former Governor James Exon and Senator Bob Kerrey and gubernatorial candidate in 1990
James D. McFarland, state senator
Robb Nimic, perennial candidate
Luis R. Calvillo

Results

Republican primary

Candidates
Mike Johanns, Mayor of Lincoln
John Breslow, Nebraska State Auditor
Jon Christensen, U.S. Congressman
Barry Richards, perennial candidate
Lavern Bartels

Results

General election

Results

References

1998
Nebraska
Gubernatorial